Saraburiwitthaykhom School (abbreviated as SBW) is a government-funded coeducational Buddhist school in Pak Phrieo, Mueang Saraburi district, Saraburi, Thailand.

History
Saraburiwitthayakhom School was built by Boon Monk, the abbott of Saladeang Temple, on 28 April 1902. At that time, its name was Watsaladeang School. In 1913, Watsaladeang School moved to Pak Phrioe Temple and the name was changed to Saraburi School. Students were separated by gender, and the females students were moved to Sahayying School.

In 1938, Saraburi School moved to a new location, 532 Phahonyothin Road, Pak Phrieo, Muang Saraburi, Saraburi, Thailand, 18000. Pol. Gen. Pramarn Adireksarn was contacted by the RAD (Religious Affairs Department) to obtain the land and build the education building. At one time, this building was the longest in Thailand, but it was later partially demolished to build to a new building. Today, it is only half of the original building.

On 24 March 1972, Saraburi School and Sahayying School were integrated to form Saraburiwitthayakhom School, and became coeducational.

School symbol and colors
The school symbol consists of three components: stairs, which represent effort, mandapa, which represents success, and a glow, representing the glory of the student's intellect. The mandapas in Saraburi is the sanctuary of the people. Buddhists believe Buddha is the best instructor in the world.

The school colors are yellow, the color of the King, and blue, the color of the Queen.

Curricula

Coursework at Saraburwitthayakhom School includes Thai, Japanese, English, Chinese, French, Mathematics, Drawing, Astronomy, Sociology, Economics, Science, History, Geography, Chemistry, Biology, Physics and Agriculture.

References

External links
 

Schools in Thailand
Buddhist schools